MSEA may refer to:
Mainland Southeast Asia, or Indochina
Mainland Southeast Asia linguistic area
Magadh Stock Exchange Association
Maine State Employees Association, the public sector union in Maine
MapleStory Southeast Asia
Metabolite Set Enrichment Analysis, a bioinformatics tool
Minnesota School Employees Association, an independent public sector union of classified (non-certified) public school staff in Minnesota.